Gyabankrom is a community in the Abura/Asebu/Kwamankese District in the Central Region of Ghana. Garri is produced and oil palm is processed in Gyabankrom.

Institutions 

 Afrangua District Assembly Basic School
 Mpeseduadze Bob Beadle JHS
 Betsingua District Assembly Basic School

Notable native 

 Lawyer Obo Kofi Imbeah (died 2018)

References 

Central Region (Ghana)
Communities in Ghana